Huang Chih-ta (born 28 February 1972) is a Taiwanese politician.

Early life and family
Huang Chi-ta's maternal grandfather  was a banker in Yilan County who was killed during the aftermath of 228 incident, as National Revolutionary Army personnel landed in Yilan.  Huang was born on 28 February 1972, the 25th anniversary of the 228 incident.
Huang Chi-ta earned bachelor's degree from National Chengchi University, followed by a master's degree from Tamkang University.

Political career
Huang was deputy director of the Democratic Progressive Party's Department of International Affairs. During Su Tseng-chang's tenure as chairman of the Democratic Progressive Party from 2012 to 2014, Huang was a deputy leader of the party's Central Committee. He then joined Su's . Within the Lin Chuan cabinet, Huang worked for vice premier Lin Hsi-yao. While William Lai held the premiership, Huang served as Lai's office director. He left the position to aid the 2018 New Taipei mayoral campaign of Su Tseng-chang. After Su's loss in the mayoral election, he replaced Lai as premier, and retained Huang as office director. Upon the second inauguration of President Tsai Ing-wen in 2020, Huang was appointed a minister without portfolio.

References

1972 births
Living people
Government ministers of Taiwan
21st-century Taiwanese politicians
Tamkang University alumni
National Chengchi University alumni
Democratic Progressive Party (Taiwan) politicians